Enrique Serna (born 11 January 1959) is a Mexican writer.

Serna was born in Mexico City. Before devoting himself entirely to literature, he was a scriptwriter for various Mexican soap operas and wrote biographies of popular Mexican figures as well as working in the advertising industry as a copywriter. He has published the novels Señorita México, Uno soñaba que era rey, El miedo a los animales, El seductor de la patria (winner of the Mazatlán Prize),  Ángeles del abismo (winner of the Colima Prize), Fruta verde, La sangre erguida (winner of the Antonin Artaud Prize) and La doble vida de Jesús. His short stories, collected in his books Amores de segunda mano, El orgasmógrafo and La ternura caníbal have been included in most anthologies of contemporary Mexican short stories. In 2003 Gabriel García Márquez named Serna as one of the best Mexican short story writers in an anthology published by Cambio review. As an essayist, Serna has published three books that share the dark humor of his fiction: Las caricaturas me hacen llorar, Giros negros and Genealogía de la soberbia intelectual. Some of his works have been translated into French, Italian, German, English and Portuguese. He presently writes a monthly article for the influential Mexican cultural review Letras Libres.

Books

Novels  
 
 Señorita México (1987) 
 Uno soñaba que era rey (1989) 
 El miedo a los animales (1995) 
 El seductor de la patria (1999) 
 Ángeles del abismo (2004) 
 Fruta Verde (2006) 
 La sangre erguida (2010) 
 La doble vida de Jesús (2014) 
 El vendedor de silencio (2019)

Short Stories  
 
 Amores de segunda mano (1991)
 El orgasmógrafo (2001) 
 La ternura caníbal (2013)

Essays 

 Las caricaturas me hacen llorar (1996)
 Giros negros (2008)
 Genealogía de la soberbia intelectual (2013)

Biography 

 Jorge el bueno: La vida de Jorge Negrete (1993)
 Todas mis guerras (1993), on María Félix. He is listed as editor but was, in fact, the book's ghostwriter.

Children's Literature 

 La caverna encantada (1997)
 La recompensa de Nefru (2012)

Other Work 

 Los mejores cuentos mexicanos (2000) (Compiler)
 Tríptico de juegos (2002), by Carlos Olmos (Prologue)
 Teatro completo (2007), by Carlos Olmos (Prologue and Editor)

References
 
 
Enrique Serna  at the Internet Movie Database
Enrique Serna's story "The Last Visit" at Latin American Literature Today 
Enrique Serna's story "Last Rites" at Words Without Borders
Official Page for Enrique Serna
PlanetadeLibros featuring Enrique Serna

1959 births
Living people
Mexican novelists
Mexican male writers
Male novelists
People from Mexico City